Cerrito ("small hill") is a bairro in the District of Sede in the municipality of Santa Maria, in the Brazilian state of Rio Grande do Sul. It is located in east Santa Maria.

Villages 
The bairro contains the following villages: Cerrito, Cerrito Dois, Fósseis da Alemoa, Morro do Cerrito, Morro Mariano da Rocha, Vila Floresta.

Gallery of photos

References 

Bairros of Santa Maria, Rio Grande do Sul